Lake Danao is a guitar-shaped lake on the island of Leyte in the Philippines.

It is situated in the  Lake Danao Natural Park, which also includes the Amandiwin mountain range.

It was originally named Lake Imelda and was declared a national park on June 2, 1972 by virtue of presidential memorandum issued by then President Ferdinand Marcos. Later it was renamed and declared as Lake Danao National Park on February 3, 1998 through Proclamation No. 1155 and is now protected by Republic Act No. 7586 otherwise known as the National Integrated Protected Area System (NIPAS) Act of 1992. The lake supplies potable water to at least seven towns in Eastern Leyte including Tacloban as well as the source of irrigation for ricelands in some municipalities like Dagami, Burauen, Pastrana and Tabontabon.

Origin
The lake is volcanic in origin and is probably a graben or depression produced by the Philippine Fault (or Leyte Central Fault), an active fault traversing the lake area in a N-S direction. Rock formations of the surrounding mountains include andesitic volcanic rocks of Quaternary origin in the western side, andesitic and dacitic volcanics of Miocene origin in the southeastern portion, and intermediate volcanic sediments of Quaternary origin in the northeastern side of the lake. There are wetlands found near the lake. The present lake could be the deepest portion of a much larger lake in the past. It was probably much larger in the geologic past and could have included the large wetlands and marshes. Sedimentation has probably transformed this portion of the lake into what it is today.

Threats
Various sectors of the local community had been studying the lake and its ecosystem. The major threat of avifaunal species in Lake Danao Natural Park is hunting. Key informants revealed that hunters are not only the local residents but many of them also come from other places. Birds that are mostly hunted are hornbills, doves, and pigeons. Slash-and-burn of forest for agricultural cultivation and illegal logging also has contributed to the degradation of some parts of the protected area. Establishment of human settlements within the park is also a serious threat. There have been recorded illegal settlements within the vicinity of the lake that could greatly affect its ecosystem.

See also
 List of protected areas of the Philippines

References

External links
 Geographic data related to Lake Danao (Leyte) at OpenStreetMap

Danao
Natural parks of the Philippines
Landforms of Leyte (province)
Ormoc
Inactive volcanoes of the Philippines